Mycobacterium madagascariense
Etymology: madagascariense, relating to Madagascar where it was first isolated.

Description
Polymorphic, gram-positive, nonmotile and acid-fast rods.

Colony characteristics
Smooth and glistening colonies with yellow or orange pigmentation (1-2mm in diameter).

Physiology
Rapid growth on Löwenstein-Jensen medium and Middlebrook 7H10 agar at 31 °C. No growth at 37 °C or above.

Differential characteristics
Differentiated from Mycobacterium aurum and Mycobacterium obuense by its failure to grow at 37 °C

Pathogenesis
Not known to be pathogenic.
Biosafety level 1

Type strain
First isolated from three different sphagnum biotopes in Madagascar.
Strain P2 = ATCC 49865 = CIP 104538 = JCM 13574.

References

Kazda et al. 1992. Mycobacterium madagascariense sp. nov. Int. J. Syst. Bacteriol., 42, 524–528.

External links
Type strain of Mycobacterium madagascariense at BacDive -  the Bacterial Diversity Metadatabase

Acid-fast bacilli
madagascariense
Bacteria described in 1992